Baileya is a scientific journal of horticultural taxonomy, published quarterly by the Liberty Hyde Bailey Hortorium (Cornell University). The journal was established in 1953, but is currently inactive. Its name honors the late Liberty Hyde Bailey.

Volumes
Baileya's first volume was published in March, 1953. Thereafter, volumes 2-15 were published regularly, over consecutive years, from 1954 to 1967. Volumes 16-26 (26 was the last volume), however, were published irregularly from 1968 to 1996.

References

Botany journals
Publications established in 1953
English-language journals
Cornell University
Quarterly journals
Publications with year of disestablishment missing
Defunct journals of the United States
1953 establishments in New York (state)